Portage/Ogden Dunes is a station in Porter County, Indiana serving the  municipalities of Portage, Indiana and Ogden Dunes, Indiana.  It is used by South Shore Line trains.  Ogden Dunes is a semi-gated community with one major access road off of U.S. Highway 12, and the station is located adjacent to where this road accesses the community.

Portage/Ogden Dunes is a comparatively new station, built in 1998–1999 to replace the Ogden Dunes flag stop located about a hundred feet west.  The new station also serves new residential subdivisions in and around Portage, Indiana.

The Portage/Ogden Dunes station is close to the Inland Marsh and West Beach units of the Indiana Dunes National Park.

The station has a single ground-level platform north of the tracks. Three small passenger shelters are positioned at the beginning, middle and end of the platform. South Bend bound riders are discharged in the space between inbound and outbound tracks, right over the wooden walkways that connect them to the platform. The station is accessible thanks to recently built ramp structures located on both sides of the track. They are designed to sync up to the first car of the train.

Renovation
As part of a larger project to double-track the South Shore Line, Portage/Ogden Dunes will see a renovation. Since the station is already double-tracked, it will not see a new track. However, a new high-level platform will be built adjacent to the southern (eastbound) track, with a gauntlet track to allow freight trains to pass. The existing platform adjacent to the northern (westbound) track will remain unchanged and is already accessible to passengers with disabilities due to the ramp structure. The renovation will also add a new parking lot with 354 spaces to the south of the station and a signalized pedestrian crossing of the Dune Highway to connect the station to the lot.

References

External links
 
 South Shore Line - Stations
 Article aboard station, with photos of its construction
Station from Google Maps Street View

South Shore Line stations in Indiana
Railway stations in the United States opened in 1998
Railway stations in Porter County, Indiana
Portage, Indiana